Capparis panamensis is a species of plant in the Capparaceae family. It is endemic to Panama.  It is threatened by habitat loss.

References

Flora of Panama
panamensis
Critically endangered plants
Taxonomy articles created by Polbot